3 in Jazz is an album released on the RCA label which features tracks from three separate sessions by vibraphonist Gary Burton's Quartet, Sonny Rollins & Co. and the Clark Terry Quintet recorded in 1963.

Reception 
The Allmusic review by Scott Yanow awarded the album 4 stars, stating, "three unrelated but consistently interesting sessions... Well worth picking up".

Track listing 

Gary Burton Quartet recorded in Los Angeles, California on February 14, 1963 (tracks 1, 2, 7 & 8)
Sonny Rollins & Co. recorded in New York, New York on February 20, 1963 (tracks 3, 4 & 9)
Clark Terry Quintet recorded in New York, New York on March 11, 1963 (tracks 5, 6, 10 & 11)

Personnel 
Gary Burton Quartet (tracks 1, 2, 7 & 8)
 Gary Burton — vibraphone
Jack Sheldon — trumpet
Monty Budwig — bass
Vernel Fournier — drums
Sonny Rollins & Co. (tracks 3, 4 & 9)
Sonny Rollins — tenor saxophone
Don Cherry — cornet
Henry Grimes — bass
Billy Higgins — drums
Clark Terry Quintet (tracks 5, 6, 10 & 11)
Clark Terry — trumpet, flugelhorn
Hank Jones — piano
Milt Hinton — bass
Osie Johnson — drums
Kenny Burrell — guitar
Willie Rodriguez — bongos, conga (added on tracks 5 & 11)

References 

RCA Records albums
Gary Burton albums
Sonny Rollins albums
Clark Terry albums
1963 albums
Albums produced by George Avakian